The  is the 23rd edition of the Japan Academy Film Prize, an award presented by the Nippon Academy-Sho Association to award excellence in filmmaking. It awarded the best films of 1999 and it took place on March 10, 2000 at the Grand Prince Hotel New Takanawa in Tokyo, Japan. The ceremony was hosted by actor and television presenter Hiroshi Sekiguchi and actress Mieko Harada.

Poppoya won nine awards, including Picture of the Year. Other winners included Dreammaker and Kikujiro with two, and Gohatto, I Love You, Messengers, Moumantai, Osaka Story, Owls' Castle, Salaryman Kintarō, Spellbound, The Geisha House, and The Sixth Sense with one.

Winners and nominees

Awards

Films with multiple nominations and awards

References

External links 
  - 
 Complete list of awards and nominations for the 23rd Japan Academy Prize - 

Japan Academy Film Prize
2000 in Japanese cinema
Japan Academy Film Prize
March 2000 events in Japan